The Arian Baptistry in Ravenna, Italy is a Christian baptismal building that was erected by the Ostrogothic King Theodoric the Great between the end of the 5th century and the beginning of the 6th century A.D., at the same time as the Basilica of Sant' Apollinare Nuovo.

Theodoric was an Arian Christian and decided to let the Goths (Arians) and the Orthodox Chalcedonian Christians live together but separately, and so there were separate neighborhoods and separate religious buildings. 
 
Near his palace, the king commissioned an Arian cathedral, now called the Church of Spirito Santo, but originally named Hagia Anastasis (Holy Resurrection). It was re-consecrated as the Chalcedonian cathedral of Saint Teodoro (soldier and martyr of Amasea in Pontus) in 526 AD. Little remains of the original church after its reconstruction in 1543; some historians speculate that the original mosaics were lost over a thousand years earlier during its Catholic reconstruction due to Arian themes.  During this same period, Theodoric also had the baptistry built, today referred to as "of the Arians" in order to distinguish it from the Baptistry of Neon (of the Orthodox) which is about one century older.

Shape and structure 

The Baptistry is octagonal in shape with some little apses and arched openings near the top.  Along the external perimeter there was once a walkway that stopped at the eastern apse.  Clearly, the building was once part of a larger complex.  
Inside are four niches and a dome with mosaics, depicting the baptism of Jesus by Saint John the Baptist. Jesus is shown as a beardless, half-submerged in the Jordan. John the Baptist is wearing a leopard skin. On the left stands a white-haired, old man in a green cloak, holding a leather bag, as the personification of the river Jordan, a traditional Greek depiction  of river gods. Above, the Holy Spirit in the form of a dove sprays lustral water from its beak.

Below, a procession of the Apostles, led in separate directions by Saint Peter and Saint Paul circle the dome, meeting at a throne with a jeweled crucifix resting on a purple cushion.

It took the artists several years to complete these mosaics, as can be clearly seen from the different colors of the stones used to depict the grass at the feet of the apostles.  The designs are quite simple, with a gold ground,  typically used in this era to infuse scenes with an ethereal glow.

Similarity to Eastern Orthodox architecture 

The entire composition is remarkably similar to that of the Orthodox Baptistery of Neon. The walls are bare, but were not always so. During archaeological investigations, some 170 kilograms of tessera were found on the floor.  Due to the lack of Arian references, it is believed that the artists who created the mosaics were Orthodox Christians, as the Ostrogoths were predominantly goldsmiths and not mosaic artists.

In 565, after the condemnation of the Arian sect, this small octagonal brick structure was converted into a Chalcedonian oratory named Santa Maria. Eastern-Rite monks added a monastery during the period of the Exarchate of Ravenna and further dedicated the structure to Saint Maria in Cosmedin. Around the year 1700, the structure passed into private hands, and in 1914 it was acquired by the Italian government. The Allied bombardment of World War II helped clear away other structures which had encroached on it from all sides, enabling researchers to view the details of its exterior for the first time. As with other monuments in Ravenna, the original floor is now some 2.3 meters underground.

Notability 

The Baptistry is one of the eight structures in Ravenna registered as UNESCO World Heritage Sites.

See also

 Arius
 Ostrogothic Ravenna
 History of medieval Arabic and Western European domes

Notes

Catholic baptisteries
Archaeological sites in Emilia-Romagna
Churches in the province of Ravenna
Buildings and structures in Ravenna
Palaeo-Christian architecture in Ravenna
Arianism
5th-century churches
Ostrogothic Kingdom
Early Christian art
Octagonal churches in Italy
Baptisteries in Italy